Radical 102 or radical field meaning "field" is number 102 out of 214 Kangxi radicals. It is one of the 23 radicals composed of 5 strokes. With 192 signs derived from this character in the Kangxi Dictionary, it has a frequency somewhat below average.

 is also the 106th indexing component in the Table of Indexing Chinese Character Components predominantly adopted by Simplified Chinese dictionaries published in mainland China.

The character  is a pictograph of a rice field with irrigation channels. There are several variants of the radical, which may also have other meanings.

Evolution

Derived characters

In Chinese astrology,  represents the ninth Earthly Branch and corresponds to the Monkey in 
the Chinese zodiac. In other signs such as  "coin", the radical has merely phonetic significance. In other cases, it is present due to assimilation of a similar but originally distinct radical, as in  "stomach". In the ancient Chinese cyclic character numeral system tiāngān,  represents the first Celestial stem.

Literature 

Leyi Li: "Tracing the Roots of Chinese Characters: 500 Cases". Beijing 1993, 
Rick Harbaugh, Chinese Characters: A Genealogy and Dictionary, Yale University Press (1998), .

External links

Unihan Database - U+7530

102
106